Night Hood is an animated series inspired by Maurice Leblanc's Arsène Lupin novels, produced by Cinar and France Animation S.A. for television audiences in both English and French-speaking nations. It was set in the 1930s. The series aired in Canada in 1996 on YTV and in 1998 on Teletoon under the English-language title Night Hood, and in francophone markets as Les Exploits d'Arsène Lupin.

Characters
Lupin's allies (whom he sometimes has to rescue) are his aide Grognard, veteran reporter of the New York Enquirer Kelly Kincaid, and cub reporter Max Leblanc. The police, usually represented by Inspector Ganimard and Sergeant Folenfant, try to capture Lupin at every chance. Billionaire industrialist and arms manufacturer H. R. Karst is Lupin's archenemy. Karst's assistants are a tough man named Steel, a crafty woman called Countess May Hem, a pair of slightly incompetent but cunning thugs called Joe Gila and Diesel.

Cast
Daniel Brochu as Max Leblanc
Luis de Cespedes as Arsène Lupin
Richard Dumont as Grognard
Dean Hagopian as Howard Randolph Karst
Jane Woods as Kelly Kincaid
Rick Jones as Steel
AJ Henderson as Sgt Folenfant
Walter Massey as Insp Ganimard
Michael Caloz as Young Arsène Lupin
Susan Glover as Countess May Hem

Episodes

See also
Blake and Mortimer (TV series)
Carland Cross (TV series)
Cybersix (TV series)

References

External links
 

Canadian children's animated adventure television series
French children's animated adventure television series
1996 Canadian television series debuts
1996 French television series debuts
1997 Canadian television series endings
1997 French television series endings
Television series by Cookie Jar Entertainment
Television series by DHX Media
Television series set in the 1930s
Television shows based on Arsène Lupin
YTV (Canadian TV channel) original programming
1990s Canadian animated television series
1990s French animated television series